Major Eugene C. Gordon (1845 - 1913) was a railroad construction engineer, Confederate Officer in the Civil War and subsequently founded and led Decatur Land Improvement and Furnace Company, Inc. which developed the area near Decatur, Alabama which was for a period of time a separate municipality Albany, Alabama.

Gordon was descended from an ancient Scottish lineage, one of twelve, born on his father's plantation in Upson County, Georgia. Many Gordon family members fought in the Revolutionary War. Gordon and his family invested in a series of land developments and coal mines in Alabama, Tennessee and Georgia.

Sources
Eugene C. Gordon Major 25th Alabama Cavalry Battalion
 1864 Attack on Washington, DC: A Day’s Difference

People from Athens, Georgia
People from Decatur, Alabama
Year of birth uncertain
1913 deaths